Statistics of Ekstraklasa for the 1962–63 season.

Overview
It was contested by 14 teams, and Górnik Zabrze won the championship.

League table

Results

Top goalscorers

References
 Poland – List of final tables at RSSSF 

Ekstraklasa seasons
1962–63 in Polish football
Pol